Dave McConnell (born ) is a former Scotland international rugby league footballer who played for St Helens and the London Broncos in the Super League. He has also played for Chorley Lynx, Leigh Centurions and the Rochdale Hornets.

He was named in the Scotland training squad for the 2008 Rugby League World Cup.

He was named in the Scotland squad for the 2008 Rugby League World Cup.

References

External links
Leigh profile
Dave McConnell Saints Heritage Society profile
Rugby League Project stats
SL stats
SCOTLAND RUGBY LEAGUE INTERNATIONAL HONOURS BOARD
Saints draft in untried duo
Scotland 6-12 Ireland

1981 births
Living people
Chorley Lynx players
English people of Scottish descent
Leigh Leopards players
London Broncos players
North Wales Crusaders players
Rochdale Hornets players
Rugby league players from St Helens, Merseyside
Scotland national rugby league team captains
Scotland national rugby league team players
St Helens R.F.C. players
Swinton Lions players
Rugby league hookers